To Your Eternity is a Japanese anime television series based on the manga series of the same name written and illustrated by Yoshitoki Ōima. The series was announced by Kodansha on January 8, 2020. The series is animated by Brain's Base and directed by Masahiko Murata, with Shinzō Fujita handling series composition, and Koji Yabuno designing the characters, and Ryo Kawasaki composing the series' music. The plot follows an immortal creature, Fushi, who wanders the Earth after interacting with humans and developing his own will and consciousness in the process. 

Originally scheduled to premiere in October 2020, the series was delayed to April 2021 due to the COVID-19 pandemic. The first season aired on NHK Educational TV from April 12 to August 30, 2021, and ran for 20 episodes.  Crunchyroll has licensed the anime for streaming outside of Asia. Medialink has also acquired the series to stream under its Ani-One branding.

Hikaru Utada performed the series' opening theme song "PINK BLOOD", while Masashi Hamauzu composes the first season's ending theme song, "Mediator".

A second season was announced in the final episode of the first season. Drive replaced Brain's Base in animating the second season, while Kiyoko Sayama replaced Masahiko Murata as the director. The rest of the main staff are returning from the first season. It aired from October 23, 2022, to March 12, 2023, and ran for 20 episodes. A third season was announced following the finale of the second season.

Series overview

Episode list

Season 1 (2021)

Season 2 (2022–23)

Home media release
Japanese

Notes

References

To Your Eternity